The Durier Hut (French: Refuge Durier) is a mountain hut in the Mont Blanc massif of the Alps.  It is located in Haute-Savoie department of France on the French/Italian border at an altitude of 3358 m.

References

External links
Official website

Mountain huts in the Alps
Mountain huts in France